Paute Canton is a canton of Ecuador, located in the Azuay Province.  Its capital is the town of Paute.  Its population at the 2010 census was 25,494.
It was stablished on February 26 of 1860. Its current mayor is Raul Delgado and the second in power is Freddy Gonzales.

Demographics
Ethnic groups as of the Ecuadorian census of 2010:
Mestizo  92.2%
White  4.3%
Afro-Ecuadorian  2.4%
Indigenous  0.7%
Montubio  0.3%
Other  0.2%

References

Cantons of Azuay Province